Bulbul Chakraborty is the Enid and Nate Ancell Professor of Physics at Brandeis University. She is recognized for her contributions to soft condensed matter theory studying systems far from equilibrium, such as granular materials, amorphous systems, and statistical physics. She is an elected American Physical Society and American Association for the Advancement of Science fellow.

Academic career 
Chakraborty graduated with a BSc in Physics from the Indian Institute of Technology in 1974 and earned a PhD in 1979 from State University of New York, Stony Brook. The title of her PhD thesis is "Influence of thermal disorder on electronic properties of solids". She was a postdoctoral fellow at Argonne National Laboratory, NORDITA, Denmark, and a research associate at the Indian Institute of Science. She was a Scientific Officer (equivalent of Assistant Professor) at the Materials Science Laboratory, Indira Gandhi Center for Atomic Research (1984–1986), and an Associate Research Physicist and Lecturer, in Applied Physics, at Yale University (1987–1989). Chakraborty joined the faculty in the Physics Department at Brandeis University in 1989, where she has been Full Professor since 2000.

Research contributions 
Chakraborty has made significant contributions to the understanding of the jamming transition in amorphous materials. Her group uses statistical frameworks to investigate the properties of shear-jammed and densely packed particulate materials, finding that elasticity and friction are correlated with athermal fluctuations in many disordered systems.

According to Google Scholar, her publications have received over 4,000 citations and her h-index is 34.

Awards and honors 
Chakraborty is the Enid and Nate Ancell Professor of Physics at Brandeis University. She was elected fellow of the American Physical Society (APS) in 2008 "for important theoretical contributions to diverse areas of condensed matter physics, including frustrated magnets, diffusion of light particles in metals, the glass transition, and jamming in granular systems". In 2018, the Simons Foundation awarded Chakraborty a Simons Fellowship in Theoretical Physics.
Chakraborty was elected Fellow of the American Association for the Advancement of Science (AAAS) in 2020.

Selected publications 

 
 Thomas, Jetin; Ramola, Kabir; Singh, Abhinedra; Mari, Romain; Morris, Jeffrey; Chakraborty, Bulbul (21 September 2018). "Microscopic Origin of Frictional Rheology in Dense Suspensions: Correlations in Force Space". Physical Review Letters. 121, 128002. doi:10.1103/PhysRevLett.121.128002.
 Behringer, Robert; Chakraborty, Bulbul (7 November 2018). "The physics of jamming for granular materials: a review". Reports on Progress in Physics. 82, 012601. doi:/10.1088/1361-6633/aadc3c.

External links 

Indian women physicists
Living people
Year of birth missing (living people)
Indian physicists
Brandeis University faculty
Fellows of the American Association for the Advancement of Science
Fellows of the American Physical Society